Andreas Schmelz (born 8 December 1960 in Düsseldorf) was a West German rower. Together with Georg Agrikola he finished fourth in the double scull at the 1984 Summer Olympics.

References

External links
 
 

1960 births
Living people
West German male rowers
Rowers at the 1984 Summer Olympics
Olympic rowers of West Germany
World Rowing Championships medalists for West Germany
Sportspeople from Düsseldorf